Nocardioides hwasunensis is a Gram-positive, aerobic and non-motile bacterium from the genus Nocardioides which has been isolated from water from the beach of Hwasun and the coast of Jeju Island, South Korea.

References

Further reading

External links
Type strain of Nocardioides hwasunensis at BacDive -  the Bacterial Diversity Metadatabase	

hwasunensis
Bacteria described in 2008